Elina Hänninen is a Finnish former competitive figure skater. She is the 1984 Nordic champion and a three-time Finnish national champion. Her skating club was Turun Riennon Taitoluistelu.

Competitive highlights

References 

Finnish female single skaters
Living people
Sportspeople from Turku
Year of birth missing (living people)
20th-century Finnish women